Édouard Charles Romain Collignon (1831–1913) was a French engineer and scientist, known for the Collignon projection and for his role in building railways in Russia.

Career 
After graduating from the l'École polytechnique in 1849, he became an ingénieur des ponts et chaussées. He became inspecteur des Ponts et chaussées in 1878.

In 1857 to 1862 he played an important role in the construction of railways from Saint Petersburg to Warsaw and from Moscow to Nizhny Novgorod.

He was a founding member of the Association française pour l’avancement des sciences. He was the author of studies on the Russian railways and of memoirs and treatises on mechanics.

External links 
 
 Répertoire articles by Collignon in the database of l'Association française pour l'avancement des sciences.

This article contains information from the corresponding article in French Wikipedia.

1831 births
1913 deaths
People from Laval, Mayenne
École Polytechnique alumni
École des Ponts ParisTech alumni
19th-century French engineers
French railway mechanical engineers
Members of the Ligue de la patrie française